Okonjima (Herero: place of the baboons) is a nature reserve located  from Otjiwarongo in the Omboroko Mountains of Namibia. 

Okonjima Nature Reserve is home to the Africat Foundation, a non-profit organisation for the long-term conservation of Namibia's large carnivores and other endangered species.

References

Nature reserves in Namibia
Populated places in the Kunene Region